Saqib Ali (born 14 April 1978) is a former Pakistani-born cricketer who played for the United Arab Emirates national cricket team from 2006 to 2015, including in five One Day International (ODI) matches. He captained them to the ICC World Cricket League Division Two title in 2007.

Born in Multan, Saqib emigrated from Pakistan to the UAE in 1997, finding employment with NMC Health. In Pakistan, he had played two Tests and one ODI for the national under-19 team, as well as a single List A match for Rawalpindi A in November 1994 (aged 16). A right-handed middle order batsman, he made his national debut at the 2006 EurAsia Cricket Series, and scored his maiden first-class hundred the following year, against Scotland at Sharjah. He was appointed captain in a match against Bermuda in 2007 and made 142 in his second innings after a duck in the first. His highest score was made in 2008 when he struck 195 out of his team's total of 306 as the UAE went down to Ireland.

Saqib retired from international cricket in August 2015, owing to a series of injuries.

References

External links

1978 births
Living people
Pakistani cricketers
Emirati cricketers
United Arab Emirates One Day International cricketers
Cricketers from Multan
Pakistani emigrants to the United Arab Emirates
Pakistani expatriate sportspeople in the United Arab Emirates
Emirati cricket captains
Rawalpindi cricketers